Rudolf Berg may refer to:

Rudolf Fredrik Berg (1846–1907), also known as R.F. Berg and Fritz Berg, Swedish engineer, industrialist and politician
Rudolf van den Berg (born 1949), Dutch writer and director
Rudolf Berg, pseudonym of Dietrich Klagges (1891–1971), Nazi politician

See also
Berg (surname)